The 2013–14 3. Liga was the sixth season of the 3. Liga, Germany's third-level football league.

The league consisted of twenty teams: The teams placed fourth through seventeenth of the 2012–13 season, the worst two teams from the 2012–13 2nd Bundesliga, the three promoted teams the 2012–13 Fußball-Regionalliga and the losers of the relegation play-off between the 16th-placed 2nd Bundesliga team and the third-placed 3rd Liga team.

Teams
At the end of the 2012–13 season, Karlsruher SC and Arminia Bielefeld were directly promoted to the 2013–14 2nd Bundesliga. Karlsruhe made an immediate return to the 2nd Bundesliga after being relegated in 2011–12. Bielefeld returned to the 2nd Bundesliga after two seasons in the third tier. The two promoted teams were to be replaced by Jahn Regensburg and SV Sandhausen, who finished in the bottom two places of the 2012–13 2nd Bundesliga table and thus were to be directly relegated. Both Regensburg and Sandhausen were to be relegated after cameo appearances in the 2nd Bundesliga. However, MSV Duisburg were denied a licence for the 2nd Bundesliga (though not the licence for the 3rd Liga) and were relegated. Sandhausen were given the free place in the 2nd Bundesliga.

At the other end of the table, Alemannia Aachen, SV Babelsberg 03 and SV Darmstadt 98 were to be relegated to the 2013–14 Regionalliga; Aachen entered the Regionalliga West. Babelsberg would be going to the Regionalliga North-East and Darmstadt were supposed to be relegated to the Regionalliga South-West. However, Kickers Offenbach were denied the license for the 3rd League and Darmstadt were instead allowed to stay in the 3rd League. Offenbach relegated to the Regionalliga South-West.

The three relegated teams were replaced by the three winners of the 2012–13 Regionalliga promotion playoffs. RB Leipzig from the North-Eastern division and SV Elversberg from the South-Western Division are playing their debut seasons in the 3rd Liga, while Holstein Kiel from the Northern division returned to the national level of football after three seasons in the fourth tier Regionalliga.

A further place in the league was available via a two-legged play-off between third-placed 2012–13 3rd Liga team VfL Osnabrück and 16th-placed 2012–13 2. Bundesliga sides Dynamo Dresden. The tie ended 2–1 on aggregate and saw Dresden remain in the 2nd Bundesliga.

Stadiums and locations

Personnel and sponsorships

Managerial changes

League table

Results

Top goalscorers
As of 10 May 2014

Player awards
The following players were named as player of the month throughout the season.

August:  Kingsley Onuegbu (MSV Duisburg)
September:  Michael Ratajczak (MSV Duisburg)
October:  Odisseas Vlachodimos (VfB Stuttgart II)
November:  Leonhard Haas (Hansa Rostock)
December:  David Blacha (Hansa Rostock)
February:  Francky Sembolo (Hallescher FC)
March:  Michael Gardawski (MSV Duisburg)

References

External links
3rd Liga on DFB page 

2013-14
3
Ger